Robert William Kessler (born 30 October 1995) is a German former racing cyclist, who rode professionally between 2014 and 2020, for the  and  teams.

Major results
2015
 10th Overall Dookoła Mazowsza
2017
 3rd Overall Carpathian Couriers Race
 7th Gooikse Pijl
2019
 7th Memorial Van Coningsloo
 8th Midden–Brabant Poort Omloop

References

External links
 

1995 births
Living people
German male cyclists
Place of birth missing (living people)
Cyclists from Berlin